Richard Everitt (28 July 1933 – 1 September 2004) was a British television producer and occasional director. He produced TV programmes from 1963 to 1991, including Coronation Street (1965) and Lovejoy (1986). He attended King's Ely.

References

External links

1933 births
2004 deaths
English television producers

People educated at King's Ely